Kill the Umpire is a 1950 baseball comedy film starring William Bendix and Una Merkel, directed by Lloyd Bacon and written by Frank Tashlin.

Bendix two years earlier had portrayed baseball player Babe Ruth in the biographical film The Babe Ruth Story. One of the ballplayers in this picture is played by Jeff Richards, billed as Richard Taylor, a minor-league ballplayer before becoming an actor.

Plot
Bill Johnson is a former baseball player whose fanatical devotion to the game has cost him several jobs. He remains steadfast in one thing: he hates umpires.  Matters are complicated by the fact that his father-in-law Evans is a retired umpire.

During a period of unemployment, needing a job to support his loyal wife Betty and two daughters, Johnson is forced by his father-in-law to matriculate in an umpire school.  Johnson initially tries to get himself expelled by school director Jimmy O'Brien, but eventually comes to enjoy his new job. He becomes an ump in the minor leagues, where blurred vision, caused by using the wrong eyedrops, causes him to see everything twice, earning him a nickname as "Two-Call" Johnson.

When he calls a visiting team's player safe at home plate, the crowd accuses him of dishonesty, not aware that the catcher actually dropped the ball when the runner slid into home plate, leading to a near-riot during which the home team's catcher is knocked out cold.  Johnson must disguise himself as a woman, and engage in several madcap subterfuges, to get to an important game on time, but his reputation is restored when the injured catcher recovers and praises him for his honesty as an umpire.  The crowd accepts this, although quickly reversing its opinion again after Johnson, inevitably, makes another call they do not like.

The film's climax is a manic chase scene, scripted by animator and future Jerry Lewis director Frank Tashlin.

Cast 
 William Bendix as Bill Johnson
 Una Merkel as Betty Johnson
 Ray Collins as Jonah Evans
 Gloria Henry as Lucy Johnson
 Jeff Richards as Bob Landon (billed as Richard Taylor)
 Connie Marshall as Suzie Johnson
 William Frawley as Jimmy O'Brien
 Tom D'Andrea as Roscoe Snooker
Vernon Dent as Telephone Company Official (uncredited)
Emil Sitka as Irate Baseball fan (uncredited)

External links 
 
 
 

1950 films
American baseball films
American sports comedy films
American black-and-white films
Columbia Pictures films
Films directed by Lloyd Bacon
Films with screenplays by Frank Tashlin
Films scored by Heinz Roemheld
1950s sports comedy films
1950 comedy films
1950s English-language films
1950s American films